Epolactaene is a neuritogenic fungal isolate.

References

Epoxides
Methyl esters